Hawk is the surname of:

 A. J. Hawk (born 1984), professional football player for the Green Bay Packers
 David L. Hawk (b. 1948), American management theorist, architect, and systems scientist
 Jeremy Hawk (1918–2002), English actor
 Susan Hawk (b. 1961), contestant on Survivor: Borneo and Survivor: All-Stars
 Susan Hawk (district attorney) (born c. 1970), Dallas County District Attorney
 Tony Hawk (born 1968), professional skateboarder
 Riley Hawk, (born 1992), professional skateboarder, son of Tony